Saint Silaus of Lucca (or Silave, Silan, Silao; died 1100) was an Irish bishop who died in Lucca, Tuscany, while returning from a pilgrimage.
His feast day is 17 May.

Life

The legend is that Silaus was of royal blood and became abbot of Saint Brendan's monastery.
He renounced worldly possessions and was elected bishop of a see in Ireland.
He travelled to Rome so Pope Gregory VII could consecrate him.
His sister Mingarda made a pilgrimage to Rome at the same time.
A local nobleman was attracted to her when she passed through Lucca, and on her return from Rome the nobleman imprisoned her until she agreed to marry him.
She then retired to Santa Giustina and died.
Silao heard what had happened to his sister and went to Lucca where he also died at Santa Giustina.
The nuns of that abbey elevated his body in 1180.

Monks of Ramsgate account

The monks of St Augustine's Abbey, Ramsgate wrote in their Book of Saints (1921),

Butler's account

The hagiographer Alban Butler (1710–1773) wrote in his Lives of the Fathers, Martyrs, and Other Principal Saints under May 17,

Notes

Sources

 

 

Medieval Irish saints on the Continent
1100 deaths